Turroni is a surname. Notable people with the surname include:

Costantino Bresciani Turroni (1882–1963), Italian economist and statistician
Fabio Casadei Turroni (born 1964), Italian novelist, musicologist, and journalist
Pio Turroni (1906–1982), Italian anarchist

Italian-language surnames